Same-sex marriage in British Columbia became legal on July 8, 2003, after a series of court rulings which ultimately landed in favour of same-sex couples seeking marriage licences. This made British Columbia the second province in Canada after Ontario, as well as the second jurisdiction in North America (and the fourth worldwide), to legalise same-sex marriage.

Legal history

Background
On July 4, 1995, the Legislative Assembly of British Columbia approved the Adoption Act, permitting cohabiting same-sex couples to adopt children jointly. British Columbia became the first province in Canada to allow same-sex couples to adopt. The law took effect on November 4, 1996.

In July 1997, the New Democratic Party Government of Premier Glen Clark introduced bills to recognise "the marriage-like relationship between persons of the same gender" in the Family Relations Act and the Family Maintenance Enforcement Act, granting same-sex couples the same legal rights as married spouses with regards to child custody and maintenance. Despite opposition from religious groups, the bills were passed overwhelmingly in the Legislative Assembly, and received royal assent by Lieutenant Governor Garde Gardom.

Barbeau v. British Columbia
In July 2001, eight same-sex couples filed a lawsuit in court, Barbeau v. British Columbia, arguing that banning same-sex marriage violated the Charter rights of gays and lesbians. On October 2, 2001, British Columbia Supreme Court Justice Ian Pitfield ruled against same-sex marriage, arguing it was not allowed under the Canadian Constitution. "Parliament may not enact legislation to change the legal meaning of marriage to include same-sex unions," he said. "I concur in the submission of the Attorney General of Canada that the core distinction between same-sex and opposite-sex relationships is so material in the Canadian context that no means exist by which to equate same-sex relationships to marriage while at the same time preserving the fundamental importance of marriage to the community." Justice Pitfield would be the sole judge in Canada to rule against same-sex couples. The couples appealed the decision to the Court of Appeal.

On May 1, 2003, justices of the British Columbia Court of Appeal ruled 3–0 that the denial of marriage licences to same-sex couples was a violation of the Canadian Charter of Rights and Freedoms. "Gay rights have steadily expanded since homosexuality was made legal in Canada in 1969, and these developments have substantial public support, although the matter remains controversial," the court wrote. "This evolution cannot be ignored. Civil marriage should adapt to contemporary notions of marriage as an institution in a society which recognizes the rights of homosexual persons to non-discriminatory treatment." The court gave the Government of Canada until July 2, 2004 to change the definition of marriage to include same-sex couples, similar to the ruling issued in Ontario. On July 8, 2003, the Court of Appeal issued another ruling, lifting the stay it had put on the government in its May decision. The court said it was "satisfied" and noted the Ontario Court of Appeal lifting the stay in its own ruling in June 2003. The ruling stated that "any further delay will result in an unequal application of the law between Ontario and British Columbia." A few hours after the Court of Appeal ruling, Antony Porcino and Tom Graff became the first two men to be legally wed in British Columbia. Two conservative religious groups attempted to appeal the decision to the Supreme Court of Canada but, as they only had party intervenor status in the case, their attempt was unsuccessful. Several of the plaintiff couples, many of whom had been in a relationship for decades, announced they would marry in the coming months or year.

Reactions and aftermath
Craig Maynard, spokesman for Egale Canada, said that they "are thrilled by this decision", and said they would continue to push for the legalisation of same-sex marriage across Canada. Kathleen Lahey, who was a counsel to the couples, said that the court decision "confirms that the new federal law on same-sex marriage applies uniformly across the country -- and immediately. It also makes it clear that other provinces can and should act now to extend marriage to lesbian and gay couples, instead of putting the issue off until the Supreme Court of Canada and Parliament have confirmed the new law." A spokesperson for the Roman Catholic Archdiocese of Vancouver said the diocese was "saddened" by the decision, "We're also concerned that the courts have taken over the role of legislating in our democracy. This way of making important public decisions is very wrong. A third point of concern is the impact this will have on churches and religious freedom. The prime minister has given a guarantee with respect to religious freedom, but he can't give us a guarantee with respect to what the courts might do.", the spokesperson said. Anglican Bishop Michael Ingham said he was "glad gay and lesbian people are receiving recognition of their equality rights", but that the church would "still regard marriage as a union between husband and wife": "It goes considerably further than the church has gone. We have spoken of unions and not marriage. That remains the position of our diocese. I'm glad gay and lesbian people are receiving recognition of their equality rights, but it goes beyond where we are in the church. We still regard marriage as a union between husband and wife."

In August 2003, Celia Kitzinger and Sue Wilkinson married in Yaletown. They returned to England and demanded that it recognise their marriage. This was the beginning of the marriage equality movement in the United Kingdom, but the High Court of Justice ruled against the couple in July 2006.

On June 15, 2005, a B.C. Supreme Court judge in Nanaimo granted British Columbia's first same-sex divorce in the case of J.S. v. C.F.. Although same-sex marriage had been legal in British Columbia for two years, the Divorce Act still defined marriage as being between a man and a woman. The judge, Madame Justice Laura Gerow, with the consent of the Attorney General, Irwin Cotler, changed the Divorce Act to include same-sex couples.

Provincial legislation
On November 23, 2011, the Legislative Assembly enacted the Family Law Act, which uses gender-neutral language with regards to married spouses. The Assembly also amended the Marriage Act to replace references to "husband and wife" with "spouses" in various sections and to add "or spouse" in section 20(c). The legislation, which received royal assent by Lieutenant Governor Steven Point, amended provincial law to read that each of the parties to a marriage, in the presence of a marriage commissioner and at least two witnesses, says to the other:

Two-spirit marriages
Several First Nations have traditions of two-spirit individuals who were born male but wore women's clothing and performed everyday household work and artistic handiwork which were regarded as belonging to the feminine sphere. The Nuxalk people believed that two-spirit people were influenced in "some mysterious way" by the supernatural figure . They wore women's clothing and performed women's tasks, and would form long-lasting relationships with cisgender women and even marry. The Haida people call two-spirit individuals , and the Tsimshian call them . Stó꞉lō intersex babies were sometimes left on Mount McGuire to die; "[Elders] couldn't tell its sex till about three years old; they didn't let them live unles [sic] found out only after grown, i.e. about three year old; the Chilliwacks left them to die up the mountain they called T'amiyahó:y."

One famous Kutenai two-spirit person was Kaúxuma Núpika, who, after leaving his White fur trader husband, returned to his people and adopted men's clothing and weapons, and took a wife. Kaúxuma was one of the "principal leaders" of the tribe and supernatural powers were attributed to him. He "is remembered among the Kutenai as a respected shamanic healer", a masculine occupation. The Kutenai also recognise male-bodied two-spirit people who wore women's clothing and performed women's activities. They would "participate in gathering berries [and] roots, and also in making baskets and mats, in preparing lily seeds for consumption, and in cooking meals", and would marry men. This two-spirit status thus allowed for marriages between two biological males or two biological females to be performed in Kutenai society.

Marriage statistics
In 2003, 735 same-sex marriages were performed in British Columbia. Most were between persons who resided in the United States rather than in Canada. British Columbia has become a popular marriage destination for same-sex couples, and Vancouver was listed in the "Top 10 Gay Wedding Destinations" by Lonely Planet in 2014.

The 2016 Canadian census showed that there were 11,230 same-sex couples living in British Columbia.

Religious performance
The Diocese of British Columbia has authorised its clergy to bless same-sex civil marriages since 2013. In autumn 2016, Bishop Logan McMenamie announced at a diocesan synod meeting that he will "move forward with the marriage of same-sex couples in the diocese".

Following the passage of a resolution known as "A Word to the Church" by the synod of the Anglican Church of Canada in July 2019, allowing its dioceses to choose whether to perform same-sex marriages, the bishops of the Anglican Diocese of New Westminster and the Diocese of Kootenay announced that clergy would be permitted to officiate at same-sex marriages from 1 August 2019. The measures include a freedom of conscience clause for clergy opposed to performing same-sex marriages. Pastoral arrangements are made if a same-sex couple wishes to marry in their home congregation and their priest has decided not to officiate at such marriages. The Territory of the People also allows its clergy to solemnise same-sex marriages.

The Diocese of Caledonia, encompassing parts of northern British Columbia, does not perform same-sex marriages. Its marriage canons state that "it shall be the duty of the officiating clergyman to ensure that Canon XXVII on Marriage in the Church enacted by the 23rd Session of the General Synod of the Anglican Church of Canada is followed in its entirety".

Public opinion
A June 12–July 6, 2003 Environics Research poll found a 53%–43% margin nationwide in favour of same-sex marriage. The poll concluded that British Columbia had one of the highest levels of support in the country, but did not give a figure.

A December 14–January 5, 2005 Environics Research poll found a 54%–43% margin nationwide in favour of same-sex marriage. 214 British Columbians were surveyed in the poll, and 60% of respondents said they were in favour of same-sex marriage, while 38% were opposed.

See also
Same-sex marriage in Canada
LGBT rights in Canada
Smith v Knights of Columbus

Notes

References

External links
 
 Barbeau v. British Columbia, 2003 BCCA 406

LGBT in British Columbia
British Columbia
Political history of British Columbia
British Columbia law
2003 in LGBT history